Orathanadu taluk, which is pronounced as 'Oraththanaadu' taluk, is a taluk of Thanjavur district in the Indian state of Tamil Nadu. The headquarters of the taluk are located at Orathanadu.

Demographics 

 census, the taluk had a population of 1,60,367 with 40,383 households. The total population constitute, 77,719 males and 82,648 females —a sex ratio of 1063 females per 1000 males. 15,597 children are in the age group of 0–6 years, of which 8,004 are boys and 7,593
are girls. The average literacy rate stands at 75.16% with 1,08,813 literates.

Settlements 
  
The following settlements are part of Orathanadu:

 Adanakottai
 Akkarai Vattam
 Alivoikkal
 Ammankudi (Orathanadu)
 Arasapattu
 Arumulai
 Avidanalla Vijayapuram
 Ayangudi
 Chinna Ammangudi
 Cholagankudikadu
 Cholapuram
 Eachankottai
 Illupaividuthy
 Kakkarai
 Kannathangudi East
 Kannathangudi East (Addl.)
 Kannathangudi West (Addl.)
 Kannathangudi West urachi
 Karaimeendarkottai
 Karukkakottai
 Kattukuruchi
 Kavarapattu
 Keelulur
 Kelavannipet
 Kodiyalam
 Kovilur
 Kulamangalam
 Mandalakkottai
 Medayakkottai
 Moorthiambalpuram
 Moorthiambalpuram (Panayakkottai)
 Nadur
 Neivasal South
 Nemilithippiakudi
 Okkanadukeelayur (Addl.)
 Okkanadukeelayur (Chief)
 Okkanadumelayur (Part)
 Palampudur
 Palankandakudikadu
 Panayakottai
 Pandipalamavikadu
 Panjanathikottai
 Pannikondaviduthy
 Paravathur
 Paruthiapparkovil
 Paruthikottai
 Pinnayur East
 Pinnayur West
 Ponnappur (East) I
 Ponnappur (East) II
 Ponnappur (West)
 Poovathur
 Poovathur (Pudhunagar)
 Poyyundarkudikadu
 Poyyunddarkottai I
 Pudur
 Pugal Sillathur
 Pulavankadu
 Raghavambalpuram Part
 Sadaiyarkoil
 Samayamkudikadu
 Samipatti
 Surimurthypuram (Akkaravattam)
 Thalayamangalam
 Thalukkai
 Thenammanadu North
 Thennamanadu South
 Thondarampet East
 Thondarampet West
 Tirumangalakottai East
 Tirumangalakottai West
 Ulur West
 Unjividuthy
 Uranthairayankudikadu
 Vadaseri South
 Vadakkur North
 Vadakkur South
 Vadaseri North
 Vadukkukottai
 Vandayarriruppu
 Vengarai
 Vengarai Periakottainadu
 Vengarai Thippanvidudhi
 Vettikkadu
 Yoganayagipuram

References 

Taluks of Thanjavur district